The 1986–87 2. Bundesliga season was the thirteenth season of the 2. Bundesliga, the second tier of the German football league system.

Hannover 96 and Karlsruher SC were promoted to the Bundesliga while Eintracht Braunschweig, Viktoria Aschaffenburg, KSV Hessen Kassel and FSV Salmrohr were relegated to the Oberliga.

League table
For the 1986–87 season SSV Ulm 1846, FSV Salmrohr, FC St. Pauli and Rot-Weiss Essen were newly promoted to the 2. Bundesliga from the Oberliga while 1. FC Saarbrücken and Hannover 96 had been relegated to the league from the Bundesliga.

Results

Top scorers 
The league's top scorers:

References

External links
 2. Bundesliga 1986/1987 at Weltfussball.de 
 1986–87 2. Bundesliga at kicker.de 

1986-87
2
Ger